The  is an incomplete two-lane national expressway in Oshima Subprefecture of Hokkaido, Japan. It is owned and operated by Ministry of Land, Infrastructure, Transport and Tourism and is signed E5A as an extension of the Hokkaido Expressway under the "2016 Proposal for Realization of Expressway Numbering."

Route description
Officially, the current (as of January 2019) section of expressway open is known as the Hakodate-Moheji Road. The speed limit is set at 100 km/h along its entirety. With the exception of a short section at Hakodate Junction, the expressway only has one lane in each direction.

The roads northern terminus is at an interchange with Hakodate Shindō, a southern extension of the Hokkaido Expressway. From here the road travels west out of Hakodate and in to Hokuto. Upon entering Hokuto it has a junction with Japan National Route 227. It then crosses the Kunebetsu and Ōno rivers before another junction, this time with Hokkaido Route 96. From here, the route curves to the southwest, roughly paralleling the Hokkaido Shinkansen rail line, while the older Esashi Line winds back and forth alongside the expressway. The expressway abruptly meets in temporary southern terminus at Hokkaido Route 1167 in the southern part of Hokuto near Moheji Station.

History
The expressway was first opened between Hakodate Junction and Hokuto-chūō Interchange in 2003. At the time of construction, the open interchanges in Hokuto had different names. Those interchanges were renamed Hokuto-Oiwake and Hokuto-chūō in October 2009. Shortly after, in November of the same year, the expressway was extended to Hokuto-Tomigawa. Most recently, in March of 2012 the expressway was extended to Hokuto-Moheji.

Future
Construction is underway to extend the expressway  to Kikonai; however, progress was delayed due to the finding of Jōmon period relics in the construction area. The expected completion date for this extension is 2021.

Junction list
The entire expressway is in Hokkaido.

References

External links

Expressways in Japan
Roads in Hokkaido
Proposed roads in Japan